The football tournament at the 2017 Southeast Asian Games was in Kuala Lumpur. In addition matches were played in Kuala Lumpur, Shah Alam and Selayang.

Associations affiliated with FIFA might send teams to participate in the tournament. Men's teams were restricted to under-22 players (born on or after 1 January 1995) with a maximum of three overage players allowed, while there were no age restrictions on women's teams.

In the men's tournament, Thailand continued their title as a defending champion after they won their sixteenth SEA Games men's gold medal in the tournament by beating Malaysia with a score 1–0, while Indonesia got bronze for the fourth time after beating Myanmar with a score 3–1. Meanwhile, in the women's tournament, Vietnam pipped Thailand for their fifth SEA Games women's gold medal after they scored a 6–0 win over Malaysia in a round-robin format that subsequently gave them a superior goal difference. Myanmar defended the bronze after losing to the two favourites: Vietnam and Thailand.

Competition schedule
The following was the competition schedule for the football competitions:

Venues
Four venues in three cities were used in the tournament. 

The Kuala Lumpur Football Stadium was one of the original venue for the football tournament, until it was replaced by Selayang Stadium in July 2017 due to unsatisfactory conditions in the stadium renovations. The Bukit Jalil National Stadium were also originally planned for the men's football final matches before it was changed to Shah Alam Stadium due to several factors.

Participating nations

Men's tournament

Women's tournament

Men's competition

Group stage

Group A

Group B

Knockout stage

Women's competition

Medal summary

Medal table

Medalists

See also
Football 5-a-side at the 2017 ASEAN Para Games
Football 7-a-side at the 2017 ASEAN Para Games

Notes

References

External links
  
 29th SEA Games Malaysia 2017 - Tag Archive - Sports247.My 
 29th SEA Games Malaysia 2017 - Full Schedule Download